The 2019 James Madison Dukes football team represented James Madison University during the 2019 NCAA Division I FCS football season. They were led by first-year head coach Curt Cignetti and played their home games at Bridgeforth Stadium. They competed as a member of the Colonial Athletic Association (CAA). They finished the season 14–2, 8–0 in CAA play to be CAA champions. They received the CAA's automatic bid to the FCS Playoffs where they defeated Monmouth, Northern Iowa, and Weber State to advance to the FCS National Championship Game where they lost to North Dakota State.

Previous season
The Dukes finished the 2018 season 9–4, 6–2 in CAA play to finish in second place. They received an at-large bid to the FCS Playoffs where they defeated Delaware in the first round before losing to Colgate in the second round.

On December 7, 2018, Mike Houston was formally announced and hired as the next coach of East Carolina, alongside nine staff members.

Preseason

CAA poll
In the CAA preseason poll released on July 23, 2019, the Dukes were predicted to finish in first place.

Preseason All–CAA team
The Dukes had six players selected to the preseason all-CAA team.

Offense

Liam Fornadel – OL

Defense

Ron'Dell Carter – DL

Dimitri Holloway – LB

Adam Smith – S

Rashad Robinson – CB

Special teams

D'Angelo Amos – PR

Schedule

Game summaries

at West Virginia

Saint Francis (PA)

Morgan State

at Chattanooga

at Elon

at Stony Brook

Villanova

at William & Mary

Towson

New Hampshire

Richmond

at Rhode Island

FCS Playoffs
The Dukes entered the postseason tournament as the number two seed, with a first-round bye.

Monmouth–Second Round

Northern Iowa–Quarterfinals

Weber State–Semifinals

vs. North Dakota State–Championship

Ranking movements

Players drafted into the NFL

References

James Madison
James Madison Dukes football seasons
Colonial Athletic Association football champion seasons
James Madison
James Madison Dukes football